The Responsibilities of the Novelist is a 1903 non-fiction book by Frank Norris. It was published posthumously, and it includes essays that Norris published in literary reviews about the art of novel-writing.

A 1903 review in The Los Angeles Times described the book as "original, sincere, admirable as a whole" but "defective in its own literary art" and lacking "authority."

References

External links
The responsibilities of the novelist : and other literary essays on the Internet Archive

1903 non-fiction books
American non-fiction books
Books about literature